Riama anatoloros is a species of lizard in the family Gymnophthalmidae. It is endemic to Ecuador.

References

Riama
Reptiles of Ecuador
Endemic fauna of Ecuador
Reptiles described in 1996
Taxa named by David A. Kizirian